Devavarman may refer to:

Devavarman (Maurya) ( BC), Indian emperor
Devavarman (Champa) ( AD), Southeast Asian ruler
Devavarman (Chandela dynasty) ( AD), Indian king